The 2023 FC Tulsa season is the franchise's 9th season in the USL Championship, the second-tier professional soccer league in the United States.  The team will also participate in the 2023 U.S. Open Cup.

Club

Staff

 Sam Doerr – president
 Blair Gavin – head coach
 Richie Ryan – first assistant coach
 Matt Watson – second assistant coach
 Donovan Ricketts – goalkeeping coach
 Johnathon Millwee – head athletic trainer

Competitions

Preseason
FC Tulsa announced their full preseason schedule on January 19, 2023.

USL Championship

Standings — Eastern Conference

Match results

U.S. Open Cup

References

Tulsa Roughnecks
FC Tulsa
FC Tulsa
FC Tulsa